Alexander or Alex Lindsay may refer to:

Scottish nobles
Alexander Lindsay of Barnweill (before 1279–ca. 1309), son of David de Lindsay of the Byres
Alexander Lindsay of Glenesk (before 1350–1381), knight renowned in Wars of Scottish Independence
Alexander Lindsay, 2nd Earl of Crawford (1387–1438), son of David Lindsay, 1st Earl of Crawford and Elizabeth Stewart, daughter of Robert II
Alexander Lindsay, 4th Earl of Crawford (before 1425–1453), the Tiger Earl; participated in Douglas rebellion against James II
Alexander Lindsay, 1st Lord Spynie (ca. 1564–1607), son of David Lindsay, 10th Earl of Crawford; Privy Counsellor
Alexander Lindsay, 2nd Lord Spynie (ca. 1597–1646), son of 1st Lord Spynie; fought in Thirty Years' War in the service of Christian IV of Denmark
Alexander Lindsay, 1st Earl of Balcarres (1618–1659), son of David Lindsay, 1st Lord Balcarres; Covenanter, Engager, MP, Exchequer and Earl
Sir Alexander Lindsay, 3rd Baronet (1683–1762), married Amelia, daughter of David Murray, 5th Viscount Stormont
Alexander Lindsay, 4th Earl of Balcarres (before 1695–1736), son of Colin Lindsay, 3rd Earl of Balcarres; captain in Lord Orkney's regiment; representative peer of Scotland
Alexander Lindsay, 6th Earl of Balcarres (1752–1825), son of James Lindsay, 5th Earl of Balcarres; major in American Revolution; governor of Jersey and Jamaica
Alexander Lindsay, 25th Earl of Crawford (1812–1880), son of James Lindsay, 24th Earl of Crawford; art historian, genealogist and book collector 
Alexander Edward David Lindsay, 27th Earl of Crawford (1871–1940), son of James Lindsay, 26th Earl of Crawford and 9th Earl of Balcarres; art collector; Conservative MP
Alexander Dunlop Lindsay, 1st Baron Lindsay of Birker (1879–1952), academic, moral philosopher
Alexander Robert David Lindsay, 28th Earl of Crawford (1900–1975), Unionist MP for Lonsdale; Lord Balniel 1913–1940; Knight Grand Cross for services to the Arts
Sir Alexander Martin Lindsay, 1st Baronet (1905–1981), army officer and leader of Greenland expeditions; Conservative MP for Solihull; chronicler
Alexander Robert Lindsay, 29th Earl of Crawford (born 1927),  Conservative MP for Hertford; Lord Balniel; Premier Earl of Scotland and hereditary Clan Chief of Clan Lindsay

Heraldic officials
Alexander William Lindsay (1846–1926), English heraldic official; officer of arms at College of Arms; Clarenceux King of Arms
Alexander Roger Lindsay (born 1957), Scottish-Canadian heraldic official; Aide-de-Camp to Lt Governor of Ontario and Rouge Herald of Arms Extraordinary

Sportspeople 
Alex Lindsay (footballer) (1896–1971), Scottish centre forward
Alexander Lindsay (rower) (born 1936), British Olympic rower
Alec Lindsay or Alexander Lindsay (born 1948), English footballer

Others
Alexander Lindsay of Evelick (bishop) (1561–1639), Scottish minister, Bishop of Dunkeld
Alexander Lindsay (East India Company officer) (1785–1872)
Alexander Lindsay (entrepreneur) (1841–1920), Scottish-American co-founder of Sibley, Lindsay and Curr department store
Alex Lindsay (violinist) (1919–1974), New Zealand violinist, conductor and orchestra leader
Alex Lindsay (podcaster) (born 1970), founder of the Pixel Corps

See also
Clan Lindsay
Lindsay (name)